Mendenhall Peak is a peak,  high, standing  west of Mount Wrather in the eastern part of the Thiel Mountains of Antarctica. The name, proposed by Peter Bermel and Arthur B. Ford, co-leaders of the United States Geological Survey (USGS) Thiel Mountains party which surveyed these mountains in 1960–61, is for Walter C. Mendenhall, who was, from 1931 to 1943, the fifth director of the USGS.

See also
 Mountains in Antarctica

References

Mountains of Ellsworth Land